Hadronyche is a genus of venomous Australian funnel-web spiders that was first described by L. Koch in 1873. Originally placed with the curtain web spiders, it was moved to the Hexathelidae in 1980, then to the Atracidae in 2018.

Description 
Their size varies significantly, measuring from 1 to 5 cm.  Most species in this genus, as most Myglomorphae, have a glossy black or brown carapace. They have a very long life span for spiders, having been known to live for up to 20 years. 

They can be easily identified by the raised morphology of their caput (the front part of the cephalothorax). If identification is not certain, they can be distinguished from Atrax by the unmodified or blunt apophysis in their second tibia, or from Illawarra by the male tarsi, which have two instead of tree ventral spine rows.

Venom 
While Australian funnel-web spider venom is medically significant, no human fatalities as a result have been recorded since the introduction of antivenom in 1980. The venom profile of this genus is also different from the other genera from the Atracidae family.

Distribution 
They are found in eastern Australia from northeast Queensland to Tasmania and the Gulf Ranges region of South Australia. They live primarily in the moist regions, and highlands of the east coast. Although they are also found in drier open forests in the Western Slopes of the dividing range and South Australia's gulf ranges.

Burrows 
Hadronyche spiders usually make their burrows under rocks or logs, usually in cool humid areas. As with most funnel web spiders, these spiders make funnel shaped webs. The webs have silk trip lines radiating from the entrance which function as a warning system, alerting the spiders to the presence of insect prey or a possible mate.  In the case of seasonal rains, the burrows can flood.  While these spiders are able to survive submerged for several hours by trapping air bubbles with their hair covered legs beneath their abdomens, prolonged flooding can force them to leave their burrows.  They may also leave their burrow to find a mate.

Species
, it contains 32 species, all from Australia:
Hadronyche adelaidensis (Gray, 1984) – South Australia
Hadronyche alpina Gray, 2010 – New South Wales, Australian Capital Territory
Hadronyche annachristiae Gray, 2010 – New South Wales
Hadronyche anzses Raven, 2000 – Queensland
Hadronyche cerberea L. Koch, 1873 (type species) – New South Wales
Hadronyche emmalizae Gray, 2010 – New South Wales
Hadronyche eyrei (Gray, 1984) – South Australia
Hadronyche flindersi (Gray, 1984) – South Australia
Hadronyche formidabilis (Rainbow, 1914) – Queensland, New South Wales
Hadronyche infensa (Hickman, 1964) – Queensland, New South Wales
Hadronyche jensenae Gray, 2010 – Victoria
Hadronyche kaputarensis Gray, 2010 – New South Wales
Hadronyche lamingtonensis Gray, 2010 – Queensland
Hadronyche levittgreggae Gray, 2010 – New South Wales
Hadronyche lynabrae Gray, 2010 – New South Wales
Hadronyche macquariensis Gray, 2010 – New South Wales
Hadronyche marracoonda Gray, 2010 – New South Wales, Australian Capital Territory
Hadronyche mascordi Gray, 2010 – New South Wales
Hadronyche meridiana Hogg, 1902 – New South Wales, Victoria
Hadronyche modesta (Simon, 1891) – Victoria
Hadronyche monaro Gray, 2010 – New South Wales
Hadronyche monteithi Gray, 2010 – Queensland
Hadronyche nadgee (Whitington & Harris, 2021) – Australia (New South Wales)
Hadronyche nimoola Gray, 2010 – New South Wales, Australian Capital Territory
Hadronyche orana Gray, 2010 – New South Wales
Hadronyche pulvinator (Hickman, 1927) – Tasmania
Hadronyche raveni Gray, 2010 – Queensland
Hadronyche tambo Gray, 2010 – Victoria
Hadronyche valida (Rainbow & Pulleine, 1918) – Queensland, New South Wales
Hadronyche venenata (Hickman, 1927) – Tasmania
Hadronyche versuta (Rainbow, 1914) – New South Wales
Hadronyche walkeri Gray, 2010 – New South Wales

References

External links

Atracidae
Mygalomorphae genera
Spiders of Australia
Taxa named by Ludwig Carl Christian Koch